Vachon is a provincial electoral district in the Montérégie region of Quebec, Canada that elects members to the National Assembly of Quebec. It is located within the city of Longueuil and includes most of the borough of Saint-Hubert.

It was created for the 1981 election from a part of Taillon electoral district and is named after early Quebec aviation pioneer Roméo Vachon, who worked at Trans-Canada Airlines; the district includes Montréal/Saint-Hubert Airport.

In the change from the 2001 to the 2011 electoral map, its territory was unchanged.

Members of the National Assembly
This riding has elected the following Members of the National Assembly:

Election results

|-
 
|Liberal
|Michel Bienvenu
|align="right"|11,809
|align="right"|32.58
|align="right"|+11.37

|-
|}

|-
 
|Liberal
|Linda Langlois Saulnier
|align="right"|7,885
|align="right"|21.21
|align="right"|
|-

|-
|}

Source: Official Results, Le Directeur général des élections du Québec.

|-

|Liberal
|Georges Painchaud
|align="right"|8,835	
|align="right"|32.28
|align="right"|+7.59

|-

|-

|}

|-
 
|Liberal
|Brigitte Mercier
|align="right"|8,184	
|align="right"|24.69
|align="right"|-15.08
|-

|-

|}

|-
 
|Liberal
|Brigitte Mercier
|align="right"|12,741
|align="right"|39.77
|align="right"|+5.36

|-

|-

|}

|-
 
|Liberal
|Sophie Joncas
|align="right"|11,755
|align="right"|34.41
|align="right"|-3.45

|-

|Independent
|Richard St-Onge
|align="right"|161
|align="right"|0.47 
|align="right"|-
|-

|Innovator
|André Plante
|align="right"|103
|align="right"|0.30
|align="right"|-
|}

|-
 
|Liberal
|André Nadeau
|align="right"|12,154
|align="right"|37.86
|align="right"|-7.64

|-
 
|Natural Law
|Robert Turgeon
|align="right"|300
|align="right"|0.93 
|align="right"|-
|-

|Economic
|Denis Gagnon
|align="right"|254
|align="right"|0.79
|align="right"|-
|-

|Sovereignty
|Guillaume Pereira
|align="right"|170
|align="right"|0.53
|align="right"|-
|}

|-
 
|Liberal
|Christiane Pelchat
|align="right"|15,468
|align="right"|45.50
|align="right"|-3.97

|-

|-

|Independent
|Daniel Dufour
|align="right"|979
|align="right"|2.88
|align="right"|-
|-
 
|New Democrat
|Réjean Benoit
|align="right"|620
|align="right"|1.82 
|align="right"|-0.26
|-

|Parti 51
|Paul Ducharme
|align="right"|223
|align="right"|0.66
|align="right"|-
|-

|United Social Credit
|Yves Rioux
|align="right"|138
|align="right"|0.41
|align="right"|-
|}

|-
 
|Liberal
|Christiane Pelchat
|align="right"|16,011
|align="right"|49.47
|align="right"|+10.27

|-
 
|New Democrat
|Michael Kakura Jr.
|align="right"|673
|align="right"|2.08 
|align="right"|-
|-

|Parti indépendantiste
|Daniel Courville
|align="right"|511
|align="right"|1.58
|align="right"|-
|}

|-

|-
 
|Liberal
|Jacques Roy
|align="right"|11,972
|align="right"|39.20
|-

|-
|}

References

External links
Information
 Elections Quebec

Election results
 Election results (National Assembly)

Maps
 2011 map (PDF)
 2001 map (Flash)
2001–2011 changes (Flash)
1992–2001 changes (Flash)
 Electoral map of Montérégie region
 Quebec electoral map, 2011

Politics of Longueuil
Quebec provincial electoral districts